The men's foil fencing competition at the 2008 Summer Olympics in Beijing took place on August 13 at the Olympic Green Convention Centre. There were 26 competitors from 21 nations. The event was won by Benjamin Kleibrink of Germany, the nation's first victory in the men's foil. Yuki Ota's silver was Japan's first medal in the event. Salvatore Sanzo of Italy took bronze, becoming the 10th man to win multiple medals in the event.

Background

This was the 25th appearance of the event, which has been held at every Summer Olympics except 1908 (when there was a foil display only rather than a medal event). Two of the eight quarterfinalists from 2004 returned: gold medalist Brice Guyart of France, silver medalist (and 2000 quarterfinalist) Salvatore Sanzo of Italy, bronze medalist Andrea Cassarà of Italy, sixth-place finisher Peter Joppich of Germany, and eighth-place finisher Richard Kruse of Great Britain. Sanzo had won the 2001 and 2005 World Championships; Joppich had won in 2003, 2006, and 2007. The runner-up in Joppich's latest two titles, Andrea Baldini of Italy, had tested positive for a banned diuretic and could not compete (though he was later cleared and competed in 2012). This made Joppich a heavy favorite.

Qatar and Thailand each made their debut in the men's foil. France and the United States each made their 23rd appearance, tied for most of any nation; France had missed only the 1904 (with fencers not traveling to St. Louis) and the 1912 (boycotted due to a dispute over rules) foil competitions, while the United States had missed the inaugural 1896 competition and boycotted the 1980 Games altogether.

Qualification

Nations had been limited to three fencers each since 1928. However, the 2008 Games introduced a rotation of men's team fencing events with one weapon left off each Games; the individual event without a corresponding team event had the number of fencers per nation reduced to two. Men's foil was the first event this applied to, so each nation could enter a maximum of two fencers in the event in 2008.

There were 24 dedicated quota spots for men's foil. The first 8 men in the FIE Individual Ranking (applying the two-per-nation limit) received spots. Next, 8 more men were selected from the ranking based on continents: 3 from Europe, 2 from the Americas, 2 from Asia/Oceania, and 1 from Africa; each nation could only earn one spot from this continental ranking, but it could be added to a spot from the world ranking to bring the nation up to two total. Finally, eight spots were allocated by continental qualifying events with the same split as the ranking. Nations could only earn one spot from these events and only if they had no fencer qualified through rankings.

Additionally, there were 8 host/invitational spots that could be spread throughout the various fencing events. China used only 2 of those places to max out its representation in all events, so 6 spots were assigned by Tripartite Commission invitation. Two were used in the men's foil (for Khalid Al-Hamadi of Qatar and Richard Kruse of Great Britain).

Competition format

The foil competition consisted of a five-round single-elimination bracket with a bronze medal match between the two semifinal losers. Fencing was done to 15 touches or to the completion of three three-minute rounds if neither fencer reached 15 touches by then. At the end of time, the higher-scoring fencer was the winner; a tie resulted in an additional one-minute sudden-death time period. This sudden-death period was further modified by the selection of a draw-winner beforehand; if neither fencer scored a touch during the minute, the predetermined draw-winner won the bout.

Schedule

All times are China Standard Time (UTC+8)

Results

Section 1

Section 2

Finals

Final classification

References

 Competition format

Fencing at the 2008 Summer Olympics
Men's events at the 2008 Summer Olympics